California Historical Landmarks located in  Plumas County, California are listed. 

Note the "Map of all coordinates using: OpenStreetMap" link below. Click on that link to view a map showing the locations of all the Plumas County historical properties and districts that are listed in the table.

 

|}

References

See also

List of California Historical Landmarks
National Register of Historic Places listings in Plumas County, California

  

.   
List of California Historical Landmarks
C01
Protected areas of Plumas County, California
Plumas County, California
History of the Sierra Nevada (United States)